Peter Weiß (born 12 March 1956) is a German politician of the Christian Democratic Union (CDU) who served as a member of the Bundestag from the state of Baden-Württemberg from 1998 until 2021.

Early career 
From 1985 until 1993, Weiß worked in various capacities for the German chapter of Caritas Internationalis. From 1993 until 1998, he was the managing director of the Catholic University of Applied Sciences in Freiburg.

Political career 
Weiß first became a member of the Bundestag in the 1998 German federal election, representing the Emmendingen – Lahr district. Throughout his time in parliament, he served on the Committee on Labour and Social Affairs. In addition to his committee assignments, he served as deputy chairman of the German-Brazilian Parliamentary Friendship Group.

In the negotiations to form a coalition government under the leadership of Chancellor Angela Merkel following the 2017 federal elections, Weiß was part of the working group on social affairs, led by Karl-Josef Laumann, Barbara Stamm and Andrea Nahles.

In July 2020, Weiß announced that he would not stand in the 2021 federal elections but instead resign from active politics by the end of the parliamentary term.

Other activities 
 Pax-Bank, Member of the Advisory Board on Ethics
 Maximilian Kolbe Werk, President
 Xertifix, Co-Founder and Member of the Board

Political positions 
In June 2017, Weiß voted against Germany’s introduction of same-sex marriage.

Ahead of the Christian Democrats’ leadership election in 2018, Weiß publicly endorsed Annegret Kramp-Karrenbauer to succeed Angela Merkel as the party’s chair.

References

External links 

  
 Bundestag biography 

1956 births
Living people
Members of the Bundestag for Baden-Württemberg
Members of the Bundestag 2017–2021
Members of the Bundestag 2013–2017
Members of the Bundestag 2009–2013
Members of the Bundestag 2005–2009
Members of the Bundestag 2002–2005
Members of the Bundestag 1998–2002
Members of the Bundestag for the Christian Democratic Union of Germany